The Dorchester North Burying Ground (or "First Burying Ground in Dorchester") is a historic graveyard at Stoughton Street and Columbia Road in the Dorchester neighborhood of Boston, Massachusetts.

The burial ground was established in 1634, as the front sign reads and was added to the National Register of Historic Places in 1974 and was designated as a Boston Landmark by the Boston Landmarks Commission in 1981.  The burying Ground is surrounded by a wall of concrete, with cut-out sections containing iron fencing along Columbia Road, which replaced a 19th-century decorative iron and granite fence. The original gates still provide entrance and are signified by large commemorative bronze tablets placed by the city in 1883. The site contains over 1200 markers, many of early Dorchester settlers.

Notable burials
 Humphrey Atherton
 Richard Mather
 William Stoughton
 William Tailer

See also
 List of cemeteries in Boston, Massachusetts
 National Register of Historic Places listings in southern Boston, Massachusetts

References

External links
 City of Boston, Landmarks Commission.
 
 Dorchester North Burying Ground Map, 1987

Cemeteries in Dorchester, Boston
Historic districts in Suffolk County, Massachusetts
National Register of Historic Places in Boston
Historic districts on the National Register of Historic Places in Massachusetts
Landmarks in Dorchester, Boston